William Zajíc of Valdek and Židlochovice (died 1 November 1420) was a Bohemian nobleman and politician.

Biography
William Zajíc began his career as a wage mercenary in the service Jobst of Moravia, the Margrave of Moravia. In 1399, he was recruited by Prokop of Moravia to fight against Jobst in the Moravian Margrave Wars. After the war, William Zajíc re-entered the service of Jobst, this time in a diplomatic position.

In 1403, William Zajíc made a pilgrimage to Rome, and in 1405, a pilgrimage to Santiago de Compostela. In 1407, Margrave Jobst granted him Židlochovice. He was then sent on a diplomatic mission to France. At the very end of 1407, Jobst appointed him governor of the Duchy of Luxembourg. William Zajíc participated in diplomatic negotiations in Prague at the court of Wenceslas IV. He also participated in meetings of provincial courts in Prague, Brno and Olomouc.

After the death of Margrave Jobst in 1411, William Zajíc entered the service of King Wenceslas IV. Dissatisfied, he left Wenceslas and was appointed court councilor to Sigismund of Luxembourg in 1412. In 1414, William Zajíc was sent to negotiate with Jan Hus in Konstanz. At the end of 1417, he returned to Moravia, where he participated in a session of the provincial courts. In 1419, he purchased the village and castle of Nosislav.

In 1420, William Zajíc took part in Sigismund's campaign in Bohemia and the siege of Prague before the Battle of Vítkov Hill. On 1 November 1420, together with other Moravian lords, he took part in the Battle of Vyšehrad, where he was killed in action. He died without male descendants.

In popular culture
Hanekin Hare, a character in the 2018 video game Kingdom Come: Deliverance, is based on William.

References

Further reading

1420 deaths
Medieval Bohemian nobility
15th-century Bohemian people
People of the Hussite Wars